A Mass card is a card which indicates that a person, whether living or deceased, will be included in the intentions at a specific Catholic Mass or set of Masses. The donor makes a nominal donation to a parish or monastery at which the Mass will be said, and presents the card to the person or, if deceased, their family.

The donation of a Mass stipend for the celebration of a Mass goes back to the eighth century. Mass cards are a more recent custom, with the term's first recorded use in 1930. The large number of requests for Mass cards sometimes poses a dilemma, since an individual Mass is supposed to be said to each card signed according to canon law. Typically, the diocese sets a minimum donation for Mass stipends, and donors are asked to cover this amount for expenses.

Mass cards are sometimes sold with a printed signature of an unaffiliated priest, without being linked to a specific priest or Mass being celebrated. In Ireland, a section of the Charities Act 2009 made it illegal to sell Mass cards without an arrangement with a Catholic bishop or provincial, with conviction leading to a jail sentence of 10 years or a fine of up to €300,000. The law was upheld in a constitutional challenge in 2009, in a case where one of Ireland's largest commercial Mass card sellers gave €100 each month to a canonically suspended priest in the West Indies to say three Masses for about ten thousand people, until approval was withdrawn during litigation.

References 

Mass (liturgy)